Luis Rubiños Cerna (born December 31, 1940) is a former Peruvian football goalkeeper, who played for the Peru national team between 1963 and 1972, gaining 38 caps. He was part of the Peru squad for the 1970 World Cup. At club level, Rubiños spent most of his career at Sporting Cristal.

References

External links
 
 

1940 births
Living people
People from Trujillo, Peru
Association football goalkeepers
Peruvian footballers
Peru international footballers
1970 FIFA World Cup players
Sporting Cristal footballers
Club Universitario de Deportes footballers